Ibiza, Ibiza is a 1986 Welsh comedy television film which aired on Welsh-language channel S4C. It was directed by Ronw Protheroe and stars Caryl Parry Jones, Siw Hughes, Emyr Wyn, and Huw Chiswell. It covers the stories of three women as they go on holiday to the island of Ibiza.

Cast
Caryl Parry Jones
Siw Hughes
Emyr Wyn
Islwyn Morris
Huw Chiswell
Gaynor Davies

References

Welsh television films
1986 television films
1986 films
1986 comedy films
S4C original programming
Films set in Ibiza
Welsh comedy
1986 British television series debuts